Doprastav a.s. is a Slovak construction company, which was established in 1953. The company focuses mainly on transportation construction - roads, bridges and railways.

An example of their construction is the Apollo Bridge in Bratislava. It has won an award from the European Association of Steel Construction.
In 2006, Doprastav posted a profit of 461.74 million Slovak korunas (€13.55 million) after taxation and employed 3,500 people in average.

References

External links
 Official website of Doprastav

Construction and civil engineering companies established in 1953
Construction and civil engineering companies of Slovakia
Slovak brands
1953 establishments in Czechoslovakia
Companies of Czechoslovakia